Magnesium anthracene is an organomagnesium compound that is almost invariably isolated as its adduct with three tetrahydrofuran (thf) ligands.  With the formula Mg(C14H10)(thf)3, this air- and water-sensitive orange solid is obtained by heating a suspension of magnesium in a thf solution of anthracene.

Structure and reactivity
According to X-ray crystallography, the Mg center is 5-coordinate, occupying a C2O3 ligand sphere.  The fold angle between the two benzo groups is 72.6°.

The compound behaves as a source of the carbanion [C14H10]2- as well as a source of highly reactive Mg.  With electrophiles, the compound reacts to give dihydroanthracene derivatives C14H10E2.  Electrophiles include ketones, CO2, organotin chlorides, and organoaluminium chlorides.  Ethylene inserts into one Mg-C bond.  Hydrogen induces release of anthracene, yielding magnesium hydride (MgH2).

References

Anthracenes
Organomagnesium compounds